M'Bala is a surname, and may refer to;

 Dieudonné M'bala M'bala, French comedian, actor and political activist
 Borgia M'Bala, French basketball player who played for Bluefield College, Basket club Nord Ardèche and BG Aschersleben Tigers
 Roger Gnoan M'Bala, Ivorian director
 Christophe M'Bala, character on the French animated television series Code Lyoko
 M'bala N'dombassi, French boxer
 Kevin M'Bala, football player for Arlesey Town F.C.
 Cedric M'Bala, football player, who played for PSFC Chernomorets Burgas
 Placide M'Bala, Cameroonian writer

M'Bala also means elephant in Banda.

Notes and references

See also
M'Bala, Mozambique in the Gaza Province
Mbala (disambiguation)

External links
 M'Bala Family on GeneaNet

Bantu-language surnames